Mo is an uncommon Korean surname, It originated from either of two hanja ( or ), which are also used respectively to write the Chinese surnames Móu or Máo. The 2000 South Korean census found a total of 19,834 people and 6,110 households with these surnames. The surname is spelled Mo in all standard methods of romanizing the Korean language. In a study by the National Institute of the Korean Language based on 2007 application data for South Korean passports, all the applicants spelled this surname as Mo. The alternative spelling Moh is occasionally seen.

More common lineage
, also called , is the more common of the two hanja used to write the surname Mo. This character was originally used to write a Chinese surname now pronounced Móu in Mandarin. In 1960 it was the 92nd-most common surname in South Korea, falling to 93rd by 1985. The 2000 South Korean census found 18,955 people with this family name, and 5,838 households. The surviving bon-gwan (origin of a clan lineages, not necessarily the current residence of clan members) at that time included:

Hampyeong, South Jeolla (see Hampyeong Mo clan): 17,939 people and 5,546 households. They claim descent from Mo Gyeong, who came from the Hongnong Commandery (in present-day Henan), China to Korea, and aided in suppressing the rebellion by Yi Ja-gyeom during the reign of Injong of Goryeo.
Jinju, South Gyeongsang: 972 people and 285 households. They are likely a branch of the Hampyeong Mo clan. They claim descent from Mo Sun, an official during the reign of Taejo of Joseon.
Naju, South Jeolla: Two people and zero households.
Other or unknown: 34 people and seven households.

Less common lineage
 is the less common of the two hanja used to write the surname Mo. This character was originally used to write a Chinese surname now pronounced Máo in Mandarin. In 1960 it was the 146th-most common surname in South Korea, falling to 164th by 1985. The 2000 South Korean census found 879 people with this family name, and 272 households. The surviving bon-gwan at that time included:
Gongju, South Chungcheong: 352 people and 114 households. The founding ancestor of the clan is not known.
Guangzhou, China: 309 people and 95 households. Members of the Guangzhou Mo clan claim distant ancestry from China, where this surname originated in the Xihe Commandery (present-day Shaanxi). It is not clear when the founding ancestor brought the surname to the Korean peninsula or where he lived, but it is believed to be somewhere in Chongju, North Pyongan.
Gimhae, South Gyeongsang: 101 people and 28 households.
Seosan, South Chungcheong: 91 people and 26 households.
Other or unknown: 26 people and nine households.

People
People with this surname include:
Moh Youn-sook (1910–1990), South Korean poet
Mo Myeong-hui (born 1963), South Korean sprinter
Mo Ji-soo (born 1969), South Korean speed skater
Mo Joong-kyung (born 1971), South Korean golfer
Mo Chang-min (born 1985), South Korean baseball player
Mo Tae-bum (born 1989), South Korean speed skater

See also
:Category:Mo clans of Korea

Notes

References

Korean-language surnames